FC Anker Wismar is a German association football club based in Wismar, Germany, currently playing in the Verbandsliga Mecklenburg-Vorpommern.

History 
This club's origins dates back to 1904 when the  FC Elite Wismar were established. The following year, the club was renamed to Wismarer FC 1905. From 1909 the club was known as Germania Wismar and during the World War II, TSV Wismar played in the Gauliga Nordmark. After the war, the club was renamed no less than four more times (SG Wismar Süd, ZSG Anker Wismar, BSG Anker Wismar and BSG Motor Wismar) before settling on the name TSG Wismar under which they played in the DDR-Liga (prior to German reunification) up until 1997 when the club was finally renamed FC Anker Wismar and as such they have become champions of the Verbandsliga Mecklenburg-Vorpommern four times – in 2000, 2004, 2010 and 2015. On each occasion the club won promotion to the NOFV-Oberliga Nord but was relegated back to the Verbandsliga again the previous three times after a short time.

Honours
The club's honours:
 Verbandsliga Mecklenburg-Vorpommern
 Champions: 2000, 2004, 2010, 2015

References

External links 
  

 
Football clubs in Germany
Football clubs in Mecklenburg-Western Pomerania
Association football clubs established in 1997
1997 establishments in Germany
Works association football clubs in Germany